Frederick III, Duke of Legnica (22 February 1520 – 15 December 1570) was a Duke of Legnica during 1547–1551 and 1556–1559 (both times was deposed by Habsburgs Emperors Charles V and Ferdinand I).

He was the eldest son of Frederick II, Duke of Legnica-Brzeg, by his second wife Sophie, daughter of Frederick I, Margrave of Brandenburg-Ansbach.

Life
After the death of his father in 1547, Frederick III succeeded him in Legnica. His younger brother George II (George II the Pious) took possession of Brzeg.

Since the beginning of his reign he sided against the rule of Emperor Charles V, joined to the Coalition of Protestant rebel princes and made an alliance with the long-time enemy of the Habsburgs, King Henry II of France. This behavior motivated the invasion of Charles V to the Duchy of Legnica and the formal deposition of Frederick III in 1551. His eldest son Henry XI was made new Duke, but, still a minor, was cared under the regency of his uncle George II of Brzeg.

The abdication of Charles V in 1556 changed Frederick III's situation; the new Emperor, Ferdinand I, restored him in Legnica after his formal promise of obedience and loyalty to him.

Frederick III's conduct forced the Emperor to depose him for a second time (27 October 1559), this time for good. Henry XI was placed again as a Duke of Legnica and Frederick III was placed under house arrest until his death in Legnica eleven years later.

Marriage and issue
In Legnica on 3 March 1538, Frederick III married Katharina (14 April 1518 – 17 November 1581), daughter of Henry V, Duke of Mecklenburg-Schwerin. They had six children:
Henry XI (b. Schloss Liegnitz, 23 February 1539 – d. Kraków, 3 March 1588).
Sophie (b. 15 April 1541 – d. 7 August 1542).
Katharina (b. 7 February 1542 – d. 3 September 1569), married on 28 December 1563 to Frederick Casimir of Cieszyn.
Frederick (b. 29 August 1543 – d. bef. 1551).
Helena (b. March 1545/47 – d. 16 September 1583), married in 1568 to Siegmund II of Kurzbach-Militsch, Baron of Trachenberg.
Frederick IV (b. 20 April 1552 – d. 27 March 1596).

References

1520 births
1570 deaths
Dukes of Legnica